Lake Independence is a lake in Jackson County, in the U.S. state of Minnesota.

Lake Independence was named from the fact the government surveyors first saw it on Independence Day.

See also
List of lakes in Minnesota

References

Lakes of Minnesota
Lakes of Jackson County, Minnesota